Keep That Groove Going! is an album by saxophonists Plas Johnson and Red Holloway recorded in 2001 and released on the Milestone label.

Reception 

Allmusic's Richard S. Ginell said: "another Bob Porter-produced soul-jazz cooker, effortlessly suggesting tenor battles of the past. They are a most compatible duo, with Johnson displaying a slightly lighter, more overt rhythm & blues tinge, and their sure-footed note selection makes them a pleasure to hear". In JazzTimes Bill Milkowski called it a  "spirited session" and "superb recording". All About Jazz noted "Beneath the emotionally charged surface of both Johnson and Holloway’s playing lies a wellspring of intelligence and good taste. ... the septuagenarians tackle a diverse program that refutes the notion that there are artistic limitations in sustaining a groove".

Track listing
 "Keep That Groove Going!" (Red Holloway) – 6:07
 "Stuffy" (Coleman Hawkins) – 4:13
 "Serenade in Blue" (Harry Warren, Mack Gordon) – 6:49	[Holloway solo feature]
 "Go Red Go" (Arnett Cobb) – 4:13
 "Bretheren!" (Holloway) – 7:24
 "Pass the Gravy" (Plas Johnson) – 8:42
 "Jammin' for Mr. Lee" (Johnson) – 6:35
 "Cry Me a River" (Arthur Hamilton) – 5:04 [Johnson solo feature]
 "Dream a Little Dream of Me" (Fabian Andre, Wilbur Schwandt, Gus Kahn) – 6:15

Personnel
Red Holloway (tracks 1-7 & 9), Plas Johnson (tracks 1, 2 & 4-9) – tenor saxophone
Gene Ludwig – organ
Melvin Sparks (tracks 1-8) – guitar
Kenny Washington − drums

References

Milestone Records albums
Plas Johnson albums
Red Holloway albums
2001 albums
Albums produced by Bob Porter (record producer)
Albums recorded at Van Gelder Studio